The Interpretation of Dreams is an 1899 book by Sigmund Freud, the founder of psychoanalysis, in which the author introduces his theory of the unconscious with respect to dream interpretation, and discusses what would later become the theory of the Oedipus complex. Freud revised the book at least eight times and, in the third edition, added an extensive section which treated dream symbolism very literally, following the influence of Wilhelm Stekel. Freud said of this work, "Insight such as this falls to one's lot but once in a lifetime."

Dated 1900, the book was first published in an edition of 600 copies, which did not sell out for eight years. The Interpretation of Dreams later gained in popularity, and seven more editions were published in Freud's lifetime.

Because of the book's length and complexity, Freud also wrote an abridged version called On Dreams. The original text is widely regarded as one of Freud's most significant works.

Background 

Freud spent the summer of 1895 at Schloss BelleVue near Grinzing in Austria, where he began the inception of The Interpretation of Dreams. In a 1900 letter to Wilhelm Fliess, he wrote in commemoration of the place:

While staying at Schloss Bellevue, Freud dreamed his famous dream of 'Irma's injection'. He analyzed the dream as expressing an unconscious wish to be exonerated from his mishandling of the treatment of a patient in 1895. In 1963, Belle Vue manor was demolished, but today a memorial plaque with just that inscription has been erected at the site by the Austrian Sigmund Freud Society.

Overview 

Dreams, in Freud's view, are formed as the result of two mental processes. The first process involves unconscious forces that construct a wish that is expressed by the dream, and the second is the process of censorship that forcibly distorts the expression of the wish. In Freud's view, all dreams are forms of "wish fulfillment" (later in Beyond the Pleasure Principle, Freud would discuss dreams which do not appear to be wish-fulfillment). Freud states: "My presumption that dreams can be interpreted at once puts me in opposition to the ruling theory of dreams and in fact to every theory of dreams..."

Freud advanced the idea that an analyst can differentiate between the manifest content and latent content of a dream. The manifest content refers to the remembered narrative that plays out in the dream itself. The latent content refers to the underlying meaning of the dream. During sleep, the unconscious condenses, displaces, and forms representations of the dream content, the latent content of which is often unrecognizable to the individual upon waking.

Critics have argued that Freud's theory of dreams requires sexual interpretation. Freud, however, contested this criticism, noting that "the assertion that all dreams require a sexual interpretation, against which critics rage so incessantly, occurs nowhere in my Interpretation of Dreams. It is not to be found in any of the numerous editions of this book and is in obvious contradiction to other views expressed in it." Freud stated that “The interpretation of dreams is the royal road to a knowledge of the unconscious activities of the mind."

Sources of dream content 

Freud claimed that every dream has a connection point with an experience of the previous day. Though, the connection may be minor, as the dream content can be selected from any part of the dreamer's life. He described four possible sources of dreams: a) mentally significant experiences represented directly, b) several recent and significant experiences combined into a single unity by the dream, c) one or more recent and significant experiences which are represented in the content by the mention of a contemporary but indifferent experience, and d) an internal significant experience, such as a memory or train of thought, that is invariably represented in the dream by a mention of a recent but indifferent impression.

Oftentimes people experience external stimuli, such as an alarm clock or music, being distorted and incorporated into their dreams. Freud explained that this is because "the mind is withdrawn from the external world during sleep, and it is unable to give it a correct interpretation ..." He further explained that our mind wishes to continue sleeping, and therefore will try to suppress external stimuli, weave the stimuli into the dream, compel a person to wake up, or encourage him or her to overcome it.

Freud believed that dreams were picture-puzzles, and though they may appear nonsensical and worthless on the surface, through the process of interpretation they can form a "poetical phrase of the greatest beauty and significance."

Condensation, displacement, and representation in dreams 

Dreams are brief compared to the range and abundance of dream thoughts. Through condensation or compression, dream content can be presented in one dream. Oftentimes, people may recall having more than one dream in a night. Freud explained that the content of all dreams occurring on the same night represents part of the same whole. He believed that separate dreams have the same meaning. Often the first dream is more distorted and the latter is more distinct. Displacement of dream content has occurred when manifest content does not resemble the actual meaning of the dream. Displacement comes through the influence of a censorship agent. Representation in dreams is the causal relation between two things. Freud argues that two persons or objects can be combined into a single representation in a dream (see Freud's dream of his uncle and Friend R).

On Dreams 

An abridged version called On Dreams was published in 1901 as part of Lowenfeld and Kurella's Grenzfragen des Nerven und Seelenlebens. It was re-published in 1911 in slightly larger form as a book. On Dreams is also included in the 1953 edition and the second part of Freud's work on dreams, Volume Five, The Interpretation of Dreams II and On Dreams. It follows chapter seven in The Interpretation of Dreams and in this edition, is fifty-three pages in length. There are thirteen chapters in total and Freud directs the reader to The Interpretation of Dreams for further reading throughout On Dreams, in particular, in the final chapter. Immediately after its publication, Freud considered On Dreams as a shortened version of The Interpretation of Dreams. The English translation of On Dreams was first published in 1914 and the second English publication in the James Strachey translation from 1952. Freud investigates the subject of displacement and our inability to recognize our dreams. In chapter VI, page 659, he states: "It is the process of displacement which is chiefly responsible for our being unable to discover or recognize them in the dream-content" and he considers the issue of displacement in chapter VIII, page 671 as: "the most striking of the dream-work."

Contents 

The first edition begins:

Freud begins his book in the first chapter titled "The Scientific Literature on the Problems of the Dream" by reviewing different scientific views on dream interpretation, which he finds interesting but not adequate. He then makes his argument by describing a number of dreams which he claims illustrate his theory.

Much of Freud's sources for analysis are in literature. Many of his most important dreams are his own — his method is inaugurated with an analysis of his dream "Irma's injection" — but many also come from patient case studies.

Influence and reception 

 The Interpretation of Dreams was first published in an edition of only 600 copies, and these took eight years to sell. The work subsequently gained popularity, and seven more editions were printed in Freud's lifetime, the last in 1929.

The classicist Norman O. Brown described The Interpretation of Dreams as one of the great applications and extensions of the Socratic maxim "know thyself" in Life Against Death (1959). The philosopher Paul Ricœur described The Interpretation of Dreams as Freud's "first great book" in Freud and Philosophy (1965). He argued that like Freud's other works it posits a "semantics of desire". The mythologist Joseph Campbell described the book as an "epochal work", noting in The Masks of God: Creative Mythology (1968) that it was "based on insights derived from years devoted to the fantasies of neurotics". Max Schur, Freud's physician and friend, provided evidence in Freud: Living and Dying (1972) that the first dream that Freud analyzed, his so-called "Irma dream" was not very disguised, but actually closely portrayed a medical disaster of Emma Eckstein, one of Freud's patients. The psychologist Hans Eysenck argued in Decline and Fall of the Freudian Empire (1985) that the dreams Freud cites actually disprove Freud's dream theory.

The philosopher John Forrester described The Interpretation of Dreams as Freud's "masterpiece" in Dispatches from the Freud Wars (1997). He suggested that the book could be considered a form of autobiographical writing and compared it to the naturalist Charles Darwin's On the Origin of Species (1859). The philosopher Dermot Moran compared the influence that The Interpretation of Dreams exerted on psychoanalysis to that which the philosopher Edmund Husserl's Logical Investigations (1900–1901) exerted on 20th-century European philosophy in his introduction to the latter work.

The philosopher Mikkel Borch-Jacobsen and the psychologist Sonu Shamdasani noted in The Freud Files (2012) that the Swiss psychiatrist Eugen Bleuler wrote to Freud in October 1905 that he was convinced of the correctness of The Interpretation of Dreams as soon as he read it. They argued, however, that Freud's analysis of the dream of Irma's injection was partly based on Belgian psychologist Joseph Delboeuf's analysis of a dream in Sleep and Dreams. In their view, The Interpretation of Dreams should be placed in the context of the "introspective hypnotism" practiced by figures such as Auguste Forel, Eugen Bleuler, and Oskar Vogt. They charged Freud with selectively citing some authors on dreams (including Marie-Jean-Léon, Marquis d'Hervey de Saint Denys and Louis Ferdinand Alfred Maury), ignoring others (including Jean-Martin Charcot, Pierre Janet, and Richard von Krafft-Ebing), and systematically avoiding "citing the passages in the works of his predecessors which came closest to his own theories."

E. James Lieberman and Robert Kramer wrote in an introduction to a collection of letters between Freud and the psychoanalyst Otto Rank that Rank was impressed by The Interpretation of Dreams when he read it in 1905, and was moved to write a critical reanalysis of one of Freud's own dreams. They suggested that it may have been partly this reanalysis that brought Rank to Freud's attention. They noted that it was with Rank's help that Freud published the second edition of The Interpretation of Dreams in 1909. The neuropsychoanalyst Mark Blechner argued in Contemporary Psychoanalysis that even if one does not agree with Freud's theories, The Interpretation of Dreams remains a valuable record of dream texts and an analysis of the mental operations that dreams demonstrate. Art historian and filmmaker Joseph Koerner drew the title of his 2019 film The Burning Child from a dream of that title, which opens Chapter 7 of Interpretation of Dreams.

Translations 
The first translation from German into English was completed by A. A. Brill, a Freudian psychoanalyst. Years later, an authorized translation by James Strachey was published. The most recent English translation is by Joyce Crick.

Online editions 
 The Interpretation of Dreams at Project Gutenberg, Abraham Arden Brill's 1913 English translation
 , a faithful copy of the third edition translated in English by Abraham Arden Brill and published in 1913 by The Macmillan Company.
 The Interpretation of Dreams at Bartebly, derived from the same edition as above.
 The Interpretation of Dreams at Psych Web, derived from the same edition as above.
 
 Die Traumdeutung at Project Gutenberg, derived from the original text in German
 Die Traumdeutung at the Internet Archive, scans of the original text in German.

References

Further reading 
 Marinelli, Lydia and Andreas Mayer A. (2003) Dreaming by the Book: Freud's 'The Interpretation of Dreams' and the History of the Psychoanalytic Movement, New York: Other Press.  (Mayer and Marinelli explore textual changes in different versions of The Interpretation of Dreams and offer an historical account of how the book became the founding text of the psychoanalytic movement).
 The Language of Psycho-Analysis by Jean Laplanche and Jean-Bertrand Pontalis; trans. Donald Nicholson-Smith W. W. Norton & Company, 1974, 

1899 non-fiction books
1900 non-fiction books
Books by Sigmund Freud
Books about dream interpretation
Books about psychoanalysis
German-language books
History of psychology
Stage theories